Fuad al-Kibsi is a Yemeni singer. He is among the most popular singers and musicians in Yemen. Most of his music are of ancient scholarly and oral traditions of Yemen. He is son of the famous Yemeni poet, Abdallah Hashim al-Kibsi.

Early life
al-Kibsi was born in 1961 in Sanaa. He learned music from his father and he was influenced by famous Yemeni singers like al-Sunaidar, al-Anisi and al-Harithi. He studied commerce in Sana'a university and he also studied Quranic studies and Arabic syntax and morphology.

Albums

References

1961 births
Living people
People from Sanaa
21st-century Yemeni male singers
20th-century Yemeni male singers